This is a list of airports in French Polynesia, sorted by location.

French Polynesia is an overseas territory (territoire d'outre-mer or TOM) of France with the particular designation of overseas country (pays d'outre-mer or POM) in the southern Pacific Ocean. It is made up of several groups of Polynesian islands, the most famous island being Tahiti in the Society Islands group, which is also the most populous island, and the seat of the capital of the territory (Papeete).

Airport 

ICAO location identifiers are linked to each airport's Aeronautical Information Publication (AIP), which are available online in Portable Document Format (PDF) from the French Service d'information aéronautique (SIA). Locations shown in bold are as per the airport's AIP page. Most airports give two locations: the first is the city served, second is the city where the airport is located.

Airport names shown in bold have scheduled commercial airline service.

See also 
 List of airports in France
 List of airports by ICAO code: N#NT - French Polynesia
 Wikipedia:Airline destination lists: Oceania#French Polynesia (France)

References 
 French Civil Aviation site:
 Aeronautical Information Service / Service d'information aéronautique (SIA) 
 Aeronautical Information Publications (AIP) 
 Union des Aéroports Français 

 
Airports
French Polynesia
Polynesia